Hidden in the Woods is a 2012 Chilean splatter film directed by Patricio Valladares and co-written by Andrea Cavaletto and Valladares. It features a mixed cast of relatively unknown actors and well-known Chilean comedians, including Siboney Lo, Carolina Escobar, Daniel Antivilo, José Hernandez, Domingo Guzman, Daniel Candia and Nicole Perez. An English-language remake with the same name, also directed by Valladares, was released in 2014.

Plot
Ana and Anny live, along with their deformed brother/son, in the desolate southern Chilean countryside, after having been sheltered from society by their drug dealer father for their entire lives. One day the police come calling to investigate, and after bullets are fired and chainsaws are revved up, the three siblings find themselves on their own, and on the road. The trio is also on the run from their father’s crazed drug kingpin boss Uncle Costello, who is convinced the sisters know where his valuable supply is hidden. He sends an army of trained killers to track them down... but Costello and his gang find that they might be in for more than they bargained for. Amidst a world of bloody executions, roadside prostitution, sexual assault, and even cannibalism, the bodies keep on piling up.

Cast
 Siboney Lo as Ana
 Carolina Escobar as Anny
 Daniel Antivilo as The Dad
 Serge Francois Soto as Uncle Costello
 Renato Muster as Esteban
 Domingo Guzman as Sicario 1
 Daniel Candia as Sicario 2
 "Cuentrejo" as Sicario 3
 Jose Hernandez as Manuel
 Nicole Perez as Police woman

Festival awards

Winner: Best Extreme Movie, Feratum Film Festival (Mexico)
Winner: Best Movie, Buenos Aires Rojo Sangre Film Festival
Winner: Best Movie, Asti Film Festival (Italy)

Selected festivals

2012 Fantasia Film Festival
2012 London FrightFest Film Festival
2012 Celluloid Scream Film Festival
2012 Serbian Fantastic Film Festival
2012 Festival de Cine de la Habana
2012 Feratum Film Festival
2012 Buenos Aires Rojo Sangre
2013 San Diego Latino Film Festival
2013 HorrorHound Weekend
2013 Weekend of Fear Festival

Release
The film premiered on 6 August 2012 at Fantasia Film Festival and was on 23 to 27 August 2012 at the London FrightFest Film Festival. The movie was distributed by Epic Pictures Group.

Remake
An American remake of the film was directed by Valladares and produced by Michael Biehn (who also starred), Jennifer Blanc and Loris Curci.  It was filmed in Houston, Texas during 2013. The remake was released on VOD on December 2, 2016.

Soundtrack
The song "Bloodspill" by Daniel Perrson is featured over the ending credits.

References

External links
 
 
 

2012 films
2012 psychological thriller films
Films directed by Patricio Valladares
Films set in Chile
Films shot in Houston
Chilean thriller films
Backwoods slasher films
Incest in film
2010s Spanish-language films
2010s Chilean films